90' Now , is the fourth studio album by Singaporean duo By2. It was released on October 19, 2011, with a total of 10 tracks and 6 promotional singles.

Composition
The album has a total of 10 tracks, with 6 promotional singles. The title track of the album, Isn't It (有沒有), is a dance-pop, upbeat track.

Track listing

References

External links

2011 albums
By2 albums